CPO Commerce is an American online retail company that operates stores including CPO Outlets, CPO DeWALT, and Tyler Tool. CPO’s online stores are known for their selection of power tools and accessories, as well as their selection of refurbished tools. CPO Commerce also operates specialty tool stores including CPOoutlets.com and Tylertool.com.

History 

Founded in 2004, CPO has shipped over 2 million orders to contractors, woodworkers, and homeowners. CPO Commerce has been recognized by Inc. Magazine as one of the fastest growing private companies in America.

CPO was acquired in May 2014 by Essendant, a Chicago-based Fortune 500 B2B company.

References

Online retailers of the United States
American companies established in 2004
Retail companies established in 2004
Internet properties established in 2004
2004 establishments in California
Companies based in Pasadena, California